Latitude 53 Contemporary Visual Culture, more commonly known as Latitude 53, is an artist-run centre in Edmonton, Alberta.

Founded in 1973 by a collective of Edmonton artists. As far back as 1991, Latitude 53 has been heralded as "consistently been the most interesting, risk-taking public gallery in town for years." In 2013, they relocated from their main floor space in the Great West Saddlery Building to their current home at 10242 - 106 Street in Edmonton.  Latitude 53 is a member of Alberta Association of Artist-run centres.

Artexte Information Centre in Montreal, Quebec holds 69 of their exhibition catalogues in their collection.

In October 2019, Michelle Schultz was named executive director.

External links 

 https://www.latitude53.org/

Reference lists 

Artist-run centres
Culture of Edmonton
Art museums and galleries in Alberta